Lanugo is a genus of wasps belonging to the family Ichneumonidae. The name refers to the Latin word lanugo, meaning soft, downy hair, due to the hair found on species within this genus. This genus differs from the otherwise similar genus Compsocryptus by its "moderately short, straight ovipositor rather than a longer upcurved one, axillus vein closer to anal margin of hind wing, front size of areolet narrower."

Species
Species within this genus include:

 Lanugo bicincta Townes, 1962
 Lanugo brunnipennis Townes, 1962
 Lanugo cesta (Say, 1863)
 Lanugo deserti Townes, 1962
 Lanugo excincta Townes, 1962
 Lanugo ferrugata Townes, 1962
 Lanugo flavipennis Townes, 1962
 Lanugo fraternans (Cameron, 1885)
 Lanugo hebetis (Cameron, 1885)
 Lanugo longuria Townes, 1962
 Lanugo picta Townes, 1962
 Lanugo polita Townes, 1962
 Lanugo retentor (Brullé, 1846)
 Lanugo schlingeri Townes, 1962
 Lanugo sororia (Cresson, 1872)
 Lanugo yucatan Kasparyan & Ruíz-Cancino, 2005

References

Ichneumonidae genera